Patrick D. "Pat" Heinert is an American politician. He is a Republican representing District 32 in the North Dakota House of Representatives since 2016.

Personal life 

Heinert holds Bachelor of Arts and Master of Arts degrees in Management from the University of Mary.

Heinert was Sheriff in Burleigh County, North Dakota for 12 years.

Political career 

In 2016, Heinert ran for election to one of two District 32 seats in the North Dakota House of Representatives. Heinert and Republican incumbent Lisa Meier won (former representative Mark Dosch was not running for another term). Heinert is running for re-election in 2020.

As of June 2020, Heinert sits on the following committees:
 Education Policy Interim Committee
 Judiciary Interim Committee
 Education Standing Committee
 Energy and Natural Resources Standing Committee
 Ethics Standing Committee

References 

Living people
University of Mary alumni
Politicians from Bismarck, North Dakota
Republican Party members of the North Dakota House of Representatives
Year of birth missing (living people)
21st-century American politicians